Innere Neustadt may refer to:
Innere Neustadt (Bern)
Innere Neustadt (Dresden)